Elections in California are held to fill various local, state and federal seats. In California, regular elections are held every even year (such as 2006 and 2008); however, some seats have terms of office that are longer than two years, so not every seat is on the ballot in every election. Special elections may be held to fill vacancies at other points in time.  Recall elections can also be held.  Additionally, statewide initiatives, legislative referrals and referendums may be on the ballot.

In a 2020 study, California was ranked as the 10th easiest state for citizens to vote in.

Elected offices

Federal
As with every other state in the United States, California participates in federal elections including electing representatives to the House of Representatives, and senators to the Senate. Additionally, the state casts 54 votes in the Electoral College during presidential elections.

President

Every four years, the United States holds a national indirect election for president and vice president of the United States. In such elections, voters cast their votes for a slate of representatives (electors) who have pledged to cast their votes for a particular presidential and vice presidential candidate (a ticket) in the Electoral College. During the election, the voters of the state select the slate of electors on the ballot by voting for the ticket that they are pledged to. The slate of electors pledged to the ticket with the most votes statewide gets to vote in the Electoral College. Although, the electors are not obligated to vote for the candidates they are pledged to, they usually do. The number of electors the state is allocated is equal to the number of representatives in Congress that the state has (the members in the House of Representatives, plus the two senators).

Senate
California, like all other states in the United States, is represented in the United States Senate by two senators. In addition to representatives in the House of Representatives, California's senators represent the state's constituents in Congress. Alex Padilla and Dianne Feinstein currently serve as the state's senators. Each senator is elected to serve a six-year term with Kamala Harris having last been elected in 2016 and Feinstein in 2018. After Kamala Harris was elected as Vice President in 2020, Padilla was appointed to serve the remainder of her term. Each U.S. senator is elected in a statewide election following earlier primary elections typically held in the first week of June during which both major national parties (the Democrats and Republicans) and minor parties nominate candidates via popular vote. There is no limit to the number of terms that a senator may serve so long as they continue to be elected to the position via statewide vote.

House of Representatives

Similarly, California is also represented in the US Congress by fifty-two members of Congress representing the fifty-two congressional districts in the state. As in all other states, these congressional districts are reapportioned every ten years following the release of a new census. Due to its status as the most populous state in the union, California has the largest number of representatives of any single state in Congress. These representatives are elected for two-year terms as per the rules of the House of Representatives and currently feature a number of prominent members of the body such as current Speaker of the House Kevin McCarthy.

State

California has a gubernatorial election every four years, and in 2003 and 2021, gubernatorial recall elections were held. Primary elections were held in March or June until 2008, when they were held in February. General elections, which cover statewide issues, continue to be held in November. On a county-by-county basis, elections also cover electing municipal leaders. In addition, a special election can occur at any time.

State Senate 

Due to a combination of the state's large population and a legislature that has not been expanded since the ratification of the 1879 Constitution, the State Senate has the largest population per state senator ratio of any state legislative house.  Members of the State Senate serve four-year terms. Every two years, half of the Senate's 40 seats are subject to election.

State Assembly 

The lower house of the California State Legislature is the "California State Assembly".  Every two years, all 80 seats in the Assembly are subject to election.  Members elected to the Assembly prior to 2012 are restricted by term limits to three two-year terms (six years), while those elected in or after 2012 are allowed to serve 12 years in the legislature in any combination of four-year State Senate or two-year State Assembly terms.

Local

In addition, many if not most of California's county, city, school district, community college district, health care district, municipal utility district, transit district and other special district officers are elected. Per the California Secretary of State website, "political parties are not entitled to nominate candidates for nonpartisan offices at the primary election, and a candidate at the primary election is not the official nominee of any party for the specific office at the general election. [However, parties may endorse candidates.] A candidate for nomination to a nonpartisan office may not designate his or her party preference, or lack of party preference, on the ballot."

Effective January 1, 2018, all of California's cities, K-12 school districts, community college districts and special districts will have to move their election dates to a statewide election (primary or general) held during an even-numbered year due to the passage of Senate Bill 415 (California Voter Participation Rights Act), which was approved by the California Senate and Assembly and signed by the Governor in 2015. The 2018 elections will be held on June 5 (primary) and November 6 (general). Starting in 2020, the presidential primary will move to March which also include the U.S. House of Representatives, California State Senate and Assembly and County Boards of Supervisors. U.S. Senate primary in California will take place in March 2022. Los Angeles City Council and School Board will have its primary election in March and its runoff election in November beginning in 2020, due to the passage of Charter Amendments 1 and 2 during the 2015 elections.

Voting rights and voter powers

Districting

Procedure
Pursuant to Proposition 14 (2010), California uses a nonpartisan blanket primary for "voter-nominated" offices, which include:

 United States Senators,
 United States Representatives,
 State Senators,
 State Assembly members,
 the Governor,
 the Lieutenant Governor,
 the State Treasurer,
 the State Controller,
 the State Insurance Commissioner,
 the State Superintendent of Public Instruction (nonpartisan),
 the Secretary of State,
 and the State Attorney General.

In this system voters may vote for any candidate in the primary and the top two candidates who receive the most votes advance to the general election. Elections for president, vice president, political party state central committees, and county central committees are "party-nominated".

Candidates may qualify in one of two ways: by payment of a fee, or by the collection of registered voters' signatures on an in-lieu-of-filing-fee petition. Candidates must also file a "candidate intention statement" with the Secretary of State, as well as nomination forms with their home county.

Ballot propositions

A ballot proposition is a proposed law that is submitted to the electorate for approval in a direct vote (or plebiscite). It may take the form of a constitutional amendment or an ordinary statute. A ballot proposition may be proposed by the State Legislature or by a petition signed by members of the public under the initiative system. In California a vote on a measure referred to voters by the legislature is a mandatory referendum; a vote to veto a law that has already been adopted by the legislature is an optional referendum or "people's veto"; the process of proposing laws by petition is the initiative.

Political parties
There are six qualified political parties:

American Independent Party
California Democratic Party (see also Democratic Party)
Green Party of California (see also Green Party)
Libertarian Party of California (see also Libertarian Party)
Peace and Freedom Party
California Republican Party (see also Republican Party)

Political bodies attempting to qualify as a political party are:

American Moderate Party
American Solidarity Party
California Women's Party
Common Sense Party
Constitution Party of California
The Hogwash Party
Normal Party
One Party

Only the Democratic Party and Republican Party currently have representation in the State Legislature.  However, Audie Bock, a member of the Green Party, was elected in 1999 during the 1998–99 California special elections.

Local elections in California at the county and city level are officially non-partisan and political party affiliations are not included on local election ballots.

See also
1934 California gubernatorial election
Electoral history of Jerry Brown
Electoral history of Gavin Newsom
Electoral history of Ronald Reagan
Elections in the United States
Electoral reform in California
Government of California
List of California ballot propositions
List of California Governors
Political party strength in California
Politics of California
U.S. Congressional Delegations from California
Women's suffrage in California

References

Bibliography
California Secretary of State - On-Line Lists of Candidates
JoinCalifornia - California Election Statistics

External links
California Elections and Voter Information from the California Secretary of State official website
Official Voter Information Guide

California Election Statistics One Voter Project
Elections Information California Voter Foundation
 

 
Elections
Political events in California